The Canon EOS R is a 30.3 megapixel full-frame mirrorless interchangeable-lens camera launched by Canon in October 2018.

The "R" in EOS R comes from the first letter of "Reimagine optical excellence", Canon's development concept for both the EOS R system as a whole, and also for this EOS R camera which launched the new system.

Features

The EOS R was Canon's first full-frame mirrorless camera, and introduced the new EOS R system and the RF lens mount. Using an EF-EOS R mount adapter, the EOS R can accept all Canon EF and EF-S lenses. The DIGIC 8 processor is used.

Sensor

The Canon EOS R uses a full-frame (36×24mm) CMOS sensor, which can produce a still image of up to 6720×4480 pixels. ISO sensitivity can be set to values between 100 and 40,000 by default, but the EOS R can be configured to expand the permitted range down to 50 and up to 51,200 or even 102,400. The sensor is able to achieve a dynamic range of 13.5EV at ISO 50. This dynamic range is considered good, but is lower than contemporary rivals, such as the Nikon Z 7 which can achieve a dynamic range of 14.6EV at ISO 32 and was announced just a couple of weeks before the EOS R.

Displays

The EVF uses an OLED screen with 3.69 million dots, offering a 100% view of the sensor image. In addition to the EVF, a 3.15-inch LCD touchscreen and a dot-matrix LCD information panel are available. The Canon EOS R does not feature a joystick, but the touchscreen can be used in "Touch and Drag AF" mode to move the autofocus point.

The EOS R includes a two-axis (roll and pitch) electronic level display which can optionally be overlaid into the viewfinder or LCD displays, but is not available when using face or eye detection mode, nor during movie shooting mode.

A live histogram can be used when "exposure simulation" mode is enabled, and the histogram can be displayed as an overall brightness graph, or as RGB graphs.

Autofocus

The camera supports up to 5,655 manually selectable autofocus points, within a focus area which covers approximately 100% of the height and 88% of the width of the image area when shooting still images, though this area is reduced to 80% by 80% for some old EF lenses and extender combinations.

Alongside manual focus point selection, the EOS R also offers "Eye Detection AF" which finds human faces within the scene and selects an eye as the focus point, keeping track of it as the person moves around the frame. If the person is too far away, "Eye Detection AF" instead focuses on the face as a whole, though firmware release version 1.4 increased the effective distance by a factor of about three.

The autofocus system on the EOS R is able to focus at light levels down to -6 EV when using an f/1.2 lens and the central AF point.

Manual focus

Canon RF lenses use a focus-by-wire system and this allows the Canon EOS R to be configured to alter the direction and rate of focus change when turning the focusing ring on a Canon RF lens, and also to show a focus distance scale in the viewfinder while using an RF lens.

To assist with manual focus, the Canon EOS R offers "Focus Peaking" which overlays dots on the viewfinder image to show which points of the scene are in sharp focus. The EOS R also offers "Focus Guide" which adds a box overlay to the viewfinder image with indicator lines which help to zero-in the focus on the selected focus point, turning green when focus is achieved.

Video

The Canon EOS R is able to capture 4K video at 30FPS, but only by using a cropped portion of the full sensor, making wide-angle views harder to achieve. The competing full-frame mirrorless Nikon Z 6 is able to capture 4K video at 30FPS using the full sensor.

Shutter

The mechanical shutter closes if the Canon EOS R is powered off, which reduces the risk of direct sunlight damaging the sensor when not in use and helps to protect the sensor from dust and debris. Contemporary Sony mirrorless full-frame cameras do not close the shutter when powered off, and this can lead to problems with dirt on the sensor. The EOS R shutter speed can be set to values between 1/8000s and 30s. Canon states that the mechanical shutter is rated to approximately 200,000 cycles.

A "Silent Shutter" mode is available, which does not cause the mechanical shutter to operate and thus avoids making any shutter sound. However, this uses an electronic shutter mode which works by reading the sensor one line at a time, and this means that fast movement during the read will cause a rolling shutter effect, leading to an image with skewed elements. Additionally, certain features are not available while using "Silent Shutter" mode, such as anti-flicker correction, HDR mode, and the use of flash, and with some lenses the sounds of adjusting focus and aperture may be audible anyway.

Flexible Priority mode

The Canon EOS R introduces a new exposure mode called "Flexible Priority Exposure Mode" or "Fv Mode". Fv mode allows the values for aperture, shutter speed, ISO sensitivity, and exposure compensation to each be set to "AUTO" or to a specific value, and it remembers the chosen values until they are deliberately reset by pressing the right arrow on the rear four-way controller. This flexibility makes Fv mode useful for saving into custom shooting modes, though a downside is that Fv mode will ignore any minimum shutter speed configured via the system menu even if shutter speed is set to AUTO.

Multi-function Bar

The EOS R features a touch-sensitive strip called the "Multi-function Bar", intended to sit under the right thumb. The Multi-function Bar recognises swipe, tap-left, and tap-right actions, and each action can be configured to adjust a camera setting such as ISO sensitivity, view magnifier, autofocus method, MF peaking, white balance, and show/hide histogram or electronic level. Because the position of the Multi-function Bar makes it prone to accidental contact, a safety lock exists so that you must hold your finger on the bar for about a second to unlock it, though this lock can be disabled in the system menu.

Variants

On 5 November 2019 Canon announced the EOS Ra, which is physically identical to the EOS R but has a modified IR cut-off filter which allows four times more H-alpha (Hα) light to be captured, making it a camera specialised for astrophotography. The EOS Ra also allows up to 30× digital magnification (while the EOS R stops at 10×) and the added magnification makes it easier to check that dim stars are in sharp focus.

Accessories

The launch of the Canon EOS R introduced the Mount Adapters which allow EF and EF-S lenses to be used on an RF lens mount. And the EOS R is compatible with Canon Speedlite flash heads, the GP-E2 GPS Receiver, and the Directional Stereo Microphone DM-E1.

For triggering the shutter without touching the camera body, the EOS R is compatible with the Remote Switch RS-60E3, and the Wireless Remote Control BR-E1. Also, the Timer Remote Controller TC-80N3 is supported if using a Remote Controller Adapter RA-E3.

The Canon EOS R comes with an LP-E6N battery, and is compatible with the LP-E6 battery, or the newer LP-E6NH battery. The LP-E6N battery can be charged in-camera using the optional USB Power Adapter PD-E1, but the other battery types cannot. Alternatively, the included Battery Charger LC-E6 (or LC-E6E) can be used to charge all three battery types outside of the camera body.

The optional Battery Grip BG-E22 adds a second grip and controls for vertical/portrait-aspect shooting, and doubles the battery pack capacity. The BG-E22 supports the use of the USB Power Adapter PD-E1 for charging one or two LP-E6N batteries while they are in the grip, so long as no LP-E6 battery is inside. The BG-E22 also allows the camera to be powered directly from a household power outlet in combination with the optional DC Coupler DR-E6 and AC Adapter AC-E6 or with AC Adapter Kit ACK-E6.

Lenses
The Canon EOS R camera uses the Canon RF lens mount. The following lens models were available at the release date:
Canon RF 35 mm F1.8 Macro IS STM
Canon RF 50 mm F1.2 L USM
Canon RF 24–105 mm F4 L IS USM
Canon RF 28–70 mm F2 L USM

It is also possible to use older EF and EF-S lenses with one of the three available EF-EOS R mount adapters. Mount Adapter EF-EOS R is the simplest adapter, connecting to EF and EF-S lenses to the EOS R body, the Control Ring Mount Adapter EF-EOS R adds a control ring like those found on RF lenses, providing customizable control (such as ISO, aperture, etc.) with existing EF and EF-S lenses and the Drop-In Filter Mount Adapter EF-EOS R includes drop-in filter capability for use with circular polarizing filters or variable ND filters.

When using an RF or EF lens, the EOS R supports full frame mode and several cropping and aspect ratio modes: 1.6x (crop), 1:1 (aspect ratio), 4:3 (aspect ratio), and 16:9 (aspect ratio). When an EF-S lens is used, the camera automatically selects 1.6x crop mode, and neither full frame nor any of the other modes is available.

Reception

After the announcement of the Canon EOS R, the absence of certain features led to a lot of criticism, often heated, in online forums, YouTube videos, and blogs. Particular criticism was levelled at Canon for the absence of anticipated features such as dual memory card slots, full-frame 4K video, and the lack of in-body image stabilization ("IBIS").

When it came to hands-on product tests, Digital Photography Review awarded the Canon EOS R a score of 80% and compared it unfavourably to the other contemporary mirrorless cameras the Nikon Z 6 and the Sony α7 III, both of which were awarded a score of 89%. Digital Photography Review called the new Canon RF lenses "simply spectacular" and praised the image quality and autofocus accuracy of the Canon EOS R, but felt that competing mirrorless cameras offered better video, wider dynamic range, and faster burst rates.

The Canon EOS R earned a Silver Award from Photography Life and a score of 4.1 out of 5. Photography Life felt that the Canon EOS R lagged behind most competitors, again comparing the EOS R unfavourably to the Nikon Z 6 (which earned a Gold Award with 4.8 out of 5) and the Sony α7 III (which earned a Gold Award with 4.6 out of 5), but praised the EOS R's autofocus speed and image detail, and its touchscreen, grip, and durable feel.

The Canon EOS R failed to earn a "Cameralabs Recommended" award, scoring only 3.5 out of 5. Cameralabs said that the EOS R produces good-looking photos and praised its viewfinder and articulated screen, but argued that in most areas the EOS R is beaten by the Sony α7 III, which scored 4.5 out of 5 and earned the "Cameralabs Highly Recommended" award.

DxOMark evaluated the sensor in the Canon EOS R and awarded it a score of 89, noting that its score puts it just a little behind the Nikon Z 6 score of 95, and the Sony α7 III score of 96, though they also noted that the Dual Pixel architecture of the Canon sensor is likely to limit its performance.

With the initial release of the EOS R, the accuracy of its face/eye tracking autofocus mode was criticised as being weak when compared to the Sony mirrorless cameras. Canon addressed this with firmware release 1.4.0, which included improvements to eye detection autofocus. With the 1.4.0 firmware, the face/eye autofocus was considered to have greatly improved, almost closing the gap with the Sony cameras.

The innovative Multi-function Bar was largely dismissed by critics, described as "superfluous", "mystifying", "impractical in use", and a "fail". Canon has not included the Multi-function Bar on its newer RF mount designs, such as the EOS RP, EOS R5, or EOS R6.

Gallery

See also
Canon EOS RP
Canon EOS R5
Canon EOS R6
Canon EOS R3
Canon EOS M

References

External links

 
 Canon EOS R 

Canon RF-mount cameras
Cameras introduced in 2018
Full-frame mirrorless interchangeable lens cameras